Eumorpha cissi is a moth of the  family Sphingidae.

Distribution 
It is found from Venezuela south to Ecuador, Peru, Bolivia and north-western Argentina.

Description 
It is similar to Eumorpha anchemolus but the upperside ground colour is dark greenish-grey and the forewing apex is more falcate. Furthermore, there is a stronger pattern of dark transverse lines and bands on the forewing upperside.

Biology 
Adults have been recorded from February to March and from October to November in Bolivia.

The larvae probably feed on grape and vine species.

References

Eumorpha
Moths described in 1870